The flag of the State of Utah was adopted in February 2011 and consists of the seal of Utah encircled in a golden circle on a background of dark navy blue. It replaced a previous, albeit rather similar flag that had been in use since 1913. It is one of the state flags of the United States.

Since 2018, the state legislature has been working on legislation to assess the need for a new flag and to design a new flag. A task force was created in 2021.

Symbolism

A bald eagle, the national bird of the United States, symbolizes protection in peace and war. The sego lily, the state flower of Utah, represents peace. The state motto "Industry" and the beehive represent progress and hard work. The U.S. flags show Utah's support and commitment to the United States. The state name "Utah" appears below the beehive. The date 1847 represents the year the Mormon pioneers entered the Salt Lake Valley, while 1896 represents the year that Utah was admitted as the 45th state to the Union. The six arrows represent the six Native American tribes that live in Utah (Shoshone, Goshute, Navajo, Paiute, Northern Utes, and White Mesa Utes). David Rindlisbach (Art Director) placed 45 stars on the flag this time to represent Utah is the 45th state to join the Union, though the current design has 46 stars (23 on each flag).

Alternatively, the sego lily, a flowering plant that survives in the arid Great Basin climate, provided food to the early pioneer colony, helping the settlers survive the harsh winters after their arrival in the Salt Lake Valley.  Thus it became the state flower.  The eagle and flanking flags are also important symbols; Utah's is one of the few state flags to carry the American flag as part of the design.  This is because the Mormon settlers were thought not to be loyal to the United States, which was one of the reasons statehood was not granted to Utah until nearly 50 years after the original settlements.

It is one of eight U.S. state flags to feature an eagle, alongside those of Illinois, Iowa, Michigan, New York, North Dakota, Oregon and Pennsylvania. It is also one of two U.S. state flags to contain an image of the Stars and Stripes flag, the other being that of New Hampshire.

History

Mormon pioneers flag 

Flag designed by council in 1848, this flag was the first flag designed to unify the Saints as they celebrated their first pioneer day. This flag was lost in the 1850s but later recreated by the Church of Jesus Christ of Latter-day Saints in 2002 and has flown on Ensign Peak since.

Flag of the State of Deseret

According to most descriptions, the flag of the State of Deseret was similar to the flag of the State of Utah, but as it was not standardized, multiple other secular and religious alternatives were also used.

1903 design

The flag's basic design uses the Seal of Utah which was adopted by the state legislature on April 3, 1896. The seal was designed by artist Harry Edwards, and has similarities with the seal of the Utah Territory. The state's first flag was created in March 1903 to be used at the Louisiana Purchase Exposition in St. Louis, Missouri. Heber M. Wells, the governor of Utah, asked the Utah State Chapter of the Daughters of the American Revolution to oversee the creation of a flag. On May 1, 1903, the governor and his delegation marched, under the new flag, in the parade of states. The flag was blue, with the state seal and the year '1896' hand-embroidered in white thread in the flag's center. Initially, this flag was known as the "Governor's Flag" until Senate Joint Resolution 17 was passed by the legislature on March 9, 1911, making it the official state flag.

There is currently no evidence that the Utah Territory flag was made into an actual flag to fly during the Territory's existence (1850–1896), though copies have since been made.

1913 design

In 1912, the Sons and Daughters of Utah Pioneers ordered a custom made copy of the newly adopted flag to be presented to the recently commissioned battleship . When the flag arrived, the group discovered that the shield on the flag was in full color instead of white, and the manufacturer had added a gold ring around the shield. Rather than have the flag remade, Annie Wells Cannon introduced HJR 1 and the Utah legislature changed the law to allow the manufacturer's changes to become part of the official flag. Prior to being received by the Ship on June 25, 1913, the new flag was displayed at the state capitol in January 1913, then in the ZCMI windows on Main Street and at a ball held in honor of the flag.

2002 Salt Lake Tribune design contest 
In 2002, The Salt Lake Tribune, along with the North American Vexillological Association, solicited designs for a new state flag. Over 1,000 designs were collected, with the top 35 selected for judging. However, no flags from this contest were adopted by the state.

2011 correction

During the 59th state legislative session in 2011, a Concurrent Resolution (HCR002) was adopted requiring flag makers to fix a mistake found on all current Utah state flags. The mistake originated in 1922 when a flag maker misplaced the year 1847, by stitching it just above the year 1896, instead of in its correct position on the shield. It is believed every flag made since 1922 used this flag as a model, and the mistake persisted for 89 years. Later that same 2011 session, House Bill #490 passed the legislature, making March 9 an annual Utah State Flag day.

21st century redesign attempts

In 2018, state representative Steve Handy recommended legislation to create a flag review commission to seek input from the public about whether to change the flag and make a recommendation to lawmakers. The bill came at the same time as an effort to change the flag of Salt Lake City. In 2019, state representative Keven Stratton sponsored separate legislation to adopt a specific flag design. Lawmakers objected to Stratton's bill, with one comparing the design to a corporate logo. Handy amended his bill to have the commission seek designs from the public, and the bill was passed by the state House. After Handy's bill stalled in the Senate, he proposed another bill in 2020, this time keeping the current flag as a "historical flag". The Senate sponsor of the bill commissioned a set of prototype designs for lawmakers.

In 2021, state senator Dan McCay sponsored a bill to create a task force to assess the need for redesigning Utah's state flag. The bill also designated an official flag to commemorate the 125th anniversary of Utah's statehood. The bill passed in the House and the Senate and was signed into law by Governor Spencer Cox.

In 2022, the Utah State Flag Task Force accepted design submissions from the public. 5,703 designs were submitted, 2,500 of which were submitted by students. In September, 20 semifinalist designs were announced and Utahns were asked to submit their feedback. During the month-long comment period, 44,000 survey responses were given. On November 10, 2022, the Task Force submitted a final proposal to the Utah State Legislature for adoption as the official state flag. On January 18, 2023, the Utah Senate Business and Labor Committee voted 6–1 to advance the flag to the State Senate, with McCay saying he hopes the new flag design will reach Spencer Cox's desk by March 3. On January 30, 2023, the State Senate approved the bill 17–10, which advanced to the State House of Representatives for approval. However, the flag was slightly modified; the eight-pointed star was replaced by a five-pointed star after Native American representatives expressed reservations over the former, saying it looked more like an asterisk from a distance. On March 2, 2023, the Utah House of Representatives approved the bill 40–35, and the State Senate passed the concurrence vote 18–9, sending the bill to the governor's desk for signing. 

If signed by Governor Cox, the bill — and the new flag — will go into effect  by March 9, 2024. However, opponents of the new flag announced a campaign to repeal the bill. Should they obtain enough signatures, the matter will be placed on the ballot for Utah voters to decide.

See also

State of Utah
Symbols of the State of Utah
Great Seal of the State of Utah

References

Further reading
Book: How Proudly They Wave: Flags of the Fifty States by Rita D. Haban

External links

Utah State Flag 

Utah
Symbols of Utah
Flags of Utah
2011 establishments in Utah
Utah
Utah